A list of works published by Ichijinsha, included titles from its predecessors, DNA Media Comics and Issaisha, lists by release date.

1990s

1996
Megami Ibunroku Persona

1999
Bus Gamer

2000s

2000
Kanon Comic Anthology

2001
Air Comic Anthology

2002
Amatsuki
Dazzle
Foxy Lady
Guilty Gear X2
Loveless
Magical × Miracle
Makai Senki Disgaea
Saiyuki Reload
Strange+
Utawarerumono Comic Anthology

2003
Saiyuki Gaiden
Snow Comic Anthology
Tales of Symphonia Comic Anthology
Tales of Symphonia Yonkoma Kings
Vampire Doll: Guilt-Na-Zan
Weiß: Side B

2004
Carnival Phantasm
Clannad Comic Anthology volume 1
Clannad Comic Anthology volume 2
Gau-Gau Wata 2
Guilty Gear Isuka 4 Koma Kings
Guilty Gear Isuka Comic Anthology
Kotonoha no Miko to Kotodama no Majo to
MAGiMAGi
Xenosaga Episode I

2005
07-Ghost
Himuro no Tenchi Fate/School Life
Kisses, Sighs, and Cherry Blossom Pink
North Wind Fan Book
SoltyRei
Tetsuichi
To Heart 2 Comic Anthology
Touhou Project ~ Bohemian Archive in Japanese Red

2006
Clannad Comic Anthology Tokubetsu Hen
Fate/Hollow Ataraxia Anthology Comic
Kannagi: Crazy Shrine Maidens
Reverend D
Simoun
Shirasunamura
Touhou Project ~ Memorizable Gensokyo
Touhou Project ~ Perfect Memento in Strict Sense

2007
Di(e)ce
Haru Natsu Aki Fuyu
Karneval
Little Busters! Comic Anthology
Touhou Project ~ Inaba of the Moon and Inaba of the Earth
Touhou Project ~ Silent Sinner in Blue
Utawarerumono Chiri Yuku Mono e no Komoi Uta Comic Anthology

2008
Aoishiro - Waltz of the Blue Castle
Bats & Terry
Engine Sentai Go-Onger Photobook Mahha Zenkai!
G Senjō no Maō Comic Anthology
Hanjuku-Joshi
The Idolmaster Break!
Little Busters! Ecstasy Comic
Persona: Trinity Soul Comic Anthology
Sakura Familia!
School Days Kotonoha Anthology
School Heart's Tsuki to Hanabi to Yakusoku
Shizume no Itaka
Touhou Project ~ Cage in Lunatic Runagate
Umineko Biyori: Rokkenjima e Yōkoso!!
YuruYuri

2009
07-Ghost Children
Canaan Comic Anthology
Devils and Realist
Eden*
Engaged to the Unidentified
G Senjō no Maō Visual Fan Book
The Idolmaster Innocent Blue for Dearly Stars
The Idolmaster Neue Green for Dearly Stars
The Idolmaster Splash Red for Dearly Stars
Konohana Kitan
Little Busters! Ecstasy Ecstatic Anthology
Magical Somera-chan
Miritari!
Saiyuki Ibun
Sora Kake Girl R
Starry☆Sky~in Spring~ Comic Anthology
Starry☆Sky~in Summer~ Comic Anthology
Touhou Project ~ Grimoire of Marisa

2010s

2010
30-sai no Hoken Taiiku
Bokura wa Minna Ikiteiru!
Canaan Official Fanbook
Reset!
Shion no Ketsuzoku
Tales of Graces Comic Anthology
Tales of Symphonia Comic Anthology: The Best
Tenchi Muyo! War on Geminar
Touhou Project ~ Wild and Horned Hermit

2011
Danchigai
Himegoto
I Can't Understand What My Husband Is Saying
Joker no Kuni no Alice: Circus to Usotsuki Game
Little Busters! Kudryavka Noumi
Locodol
Rewrite Comic Anthology
Rewrite: Okaken e Yōkoso!!
Seitokai Tantei Kirika
Senran Kagura: Guren no Uroboros
Tales of Graces f Comic Anthology
Watashi Sekai o Kouseisuru Chiri no ...

2012
Citrus
Daitoshokan no Hitsujikai: Library 4
Hitorijime My Hero
Ixion Saga ED
Fujiyuu Sekai
Little Busters! Band Mission
Long Riders!
Masamune-kun's Revenge
My Wife is the Student Council President
Ohmuroke
Persona 4: The Ultimate in Mayonaka Arena: Comic Anthology
Shomin Sample
Touhou Project ~ Symposium of Post-mysticism

2013
Cocytus
Daitoshokan no Hitsujikai: Comic Anthology
Masamune-kun's Revenge Novel - Hazuki Takeoka
Ring Ring Busters!
Tales of Xillia 2 Comic Anthology
Tales of Xillia Yonkoma Kings
TV Anime Little Busters! Comic Anthology
Yahari 4-koma demo Ore no Seishun Rabu Kome wa machigatteiru.
Zankou Noise

2014
4-koma no Zvezda
Bakumatsu Rock
Battle Rabbits
Cocytus
The Idolmaster Million Live! Backstage
Junketsu no White Light
Miritari! Otsugata
Miss Caretaker of Sunohara-sou
NTR: Netsuzou Trap
Ojisan and Marshmallow
Persona Q: Shadow of the Labyrinth: Comic Anthology
Renai Paradise New Edition
World Conquest Zvezda Plot
Wotakoi: Love Is Hard for Otaku

2015
2DK, G Pen, Mezamashi Tokei
The High School Life of a Fudanshi
Koi to Yobu ni wa Kimochi Warui
Tachibanakan To Lie Angle
Tales of Zestiria: The Time of Guidance

2016
Éclair – Anata ni Hibiku Yuri Anthology
Jingai-san no Yome
Macross Δ: The Black-Winged White Knight
Macross Δ: The Diva Who Guides the Galaxy
Shomin Sample: I Was Spun Off by an Elite All-Girls School as a Sample Commoner
Tatoe Todokanu Ito da to Shite mo
Wataten!: An Angel Flew Down to Me
Yatogame-chan Kansatsu Nikki
Yuri Is My Job!

2017
Bocchi Kaibutsu to Moumoku Shoujo
Fate/Grand Order -mortalis:stella-
Iyana Kao sa renagara o Pants Misete moraitai Shashin-shū
My Next Life as a Villainess: All Routes Lead to Doom!
My Senpai Is Annoying
Toumei na Usui Mizuiro ni
Tsurezure Biyori
Uramichi Oniisan

2018
Azur Lane Comic à la Carte
Azur Lane Comic Anthology
Azur Lane Queen's Orders
Azur Lane: Very Slow Advance!
Citrus Plus
Comic Love Kome ~The Rice Plant or the Seed~
Eve to Eve
I Married My Best Friend To Shut My Parents Up
Inugami-san to Nekoyama-san
Masamune-kun no Revenge After School
Musanso Renai Oya ga Urusai Node ...
Scarlet

2019
The Case Files of Jeweler Richard
Isekai Senpai ー Tejina Senpai wa Kono Sekai de mo Ponkotsu na Yō Desu
Otome Game no Hametsu Flag shika nai Akuyaku Reijou ni Tensei shite shimatta... Zettai Zetsumei! Hametsu Sunzen Hen
Umineko-sou Days

2020s

2021
 Senpai wa Otokonoko

Unsorted
First Love Sisters
Gestlat
Strawberry Shake Sweet
Voiceful
Wild Adapter
Yurihime Wildrose

See also
List of manga published by Kodansha
List of works published by Kodansha

References

Ichijinsha
Lists of manga
Lists of comics by publisher
Lists of books by imprint or publisher